Josh Katz may refer to:

 Josh Katz (judoka), Australian Olympic judoka
 Josh Katz (journalist), American journalist
 Joshua Katz (classicist), American classicist

See also
 Josh Katzen (born 1992), South African rugby union player